Roger Thomas Booth (12 November 1933 – 26 February 2014) was an English actor, often on television. He appeared in many British television series and films, which include Z-Cars, No Hiding Place, The Avengers, Robbery, The Tomorrow People, Law & Order, EastEnders, The Bill and others.

His theatre work includes Alan Bleasdale's "Are You Lonesome Tonight?" at the Liverpool Playhouse, and plays with the RSC and the Bristol Old Vic.

Acting credits

References

External links

1933 births
2014 deaths
English male stage actors
English male television actors